Lana Ladd Stokan (born September 5, 1958) is a former American Democrat politician who served in the Missouri House of Representatives.

Born in El Dorado, Arkansas, she attended McCluer North High School, St. Louis Community College, and Southern Illinois University.

References

1958 births
Living people
20th-century American politicians
21st-century American politicians
20th-century American women politicians
21st-century American women politicians
Democratic Party members of the Missouri House of Representatives
Women state legislators in Missouri